Conversations with Magic Stones (Magic Stone Three) is a public art work by English artist Barbara Hepworth located at the Lynden Sculpture Garden near Milwaukee, Wisconsin. The sculpture is an abstract, modified cube form made of bronze; it is installed on the lawn. Originally, this work was created as part of a multi-part sculpture with two other bronze "magic stones" (eight-sided polyhedrons) and three "figures" (vertical abstract sculptures). One of these other works, Conversations with Magic Stones (Figure Three), is also installed at the Lynden Sculpture Garden.

References

Outdoor sculptures in Milwaukee
1973 sculptures
Bronze sculptures in Wisconsin
1973 establishments in Wisconsin
Abstract sculptures in Wisconsin